A coach (also known as a coach bus, motorcoach, or parlor coach) is a type of bus built for longer-distance service, in contrast to transit buses that are typically used within a single metropolitan region. Often used for touring, intercity, and international bus service, coaches are also used for private charter for various purposes. Coaches are also related and fall under a specific category/type of RVs.

Deriving the name from horse-drawn carriages and stagecoaches that carried passengers, luggage, and mail, modern motor coaches are almost always high-floor buses, with separate luggage hold mounted below the passenger compartment. In contrast to transit buses, motor coaches typically feature forward-facing seating, with no provision for standing. Other accommodations may include onboard restrooms, televisions, and overhead luggage space.

History

Background 

Horse-drawn chariots and carriages ("coaches") were used by the wealthy and powerful where the roads were of a high enough standard from possibly 3000 BC. In Hungary, during the reign of King Matthias Corvinus in the 15th century, the wheelwrights of Kocs began to build a horse-drawn vehicle with steel-spring suspension. This "cart of Kocs" as the Hungarians called it soon became popular all over Europe. The imperial post service employed the first horse-drawn mail coaches in Europe since Roman times in 1650, and as they started in the town of Kocs, the use of these mail coaches gave rise to the term "coach". Stagecoaches (drawn by horses) were used for transport between cities from about 1500 in Great Britain until displaced by the arrival of the railways.

One of the earliest motorized vehicles was the charabanc, which was used for short journeys and excursions until the early years of the 20th century. The first "motor coaches" were purchased by operators of those horse-drawn vehicles in the early 20th century by operators such as Royal Blue Coach Services, who purchased their first charabanc in 1913 and were running 72 coaches by 1926.

Features

As they hold passengers for significant periods of time on long journeys, coaches are designed for comfort. They can vary considerably in quality: some higher-specification coaches feature luxury seats, air conditioning, and refreshments, while others may only have the bare essentials such as storage and restrooms. Coaches typically have only a single, narrow door, but some can have two doors, as an increased loading time is acceptable due to infrequent stops. Some characteristics include:
 Comfortable seats that may include a folding table, armrests, and recliner. Comfort is considered to be an important feature in coaches.
 Luggage racks above the seats where passengers can access their carry-on baggage during the journey
 Baggage holds, accessed from outside the vehicle, often under the main floor or at the rear, where passengers' luggage can be stowed away from the seating area
 Passenger service units, mounted overhead, on which personal reading lights and air conditioning ducts can be controlled and used by individual passengers with little disturbance to other passengers
 On-board restrooms fitted with chemical toilets, hand basins and hand sanitizer
 On some coaches, on-board entertainment including movies may be shown to passengers
 On-board refreshment service or vending machines
 Wheelchair accommodation, possibly including a wheelchair lift for access
 Curtains, useful on overnight services
 Onboard AC power and Wi-Fi access

Manufacture
Coaches, like buses, may be fully built by integrated manufacturers, or a separate chassis consisting of only an engine, wheels and basic frame may be delivered to a coachwork factory for a body to be added. A few coaches are built with monocoque bodies without a chassis frame. Integrated manufacturers (most of whom also supply chassis) include Autosan, Scania, Fuso, and Alexander Dennis. Major coachwork providers (some of whom can build their own chassis) include Van Hool, Neoplan, Marcopolo, Irizar, MCI, Prevost, Volvo and Designline.

Regulations

In some European countries following the 1958 type certification treaty, coach (that is vehicle of type M2 or M3) type certification is regulated by regulation number 107 from the UNECE.  In the U.S., commercial drivers of motorcoaches are regulated by the Federal Motor Carrier Safety Administration (FMCSA).

Image gallery

Modern coaches
A representative selection of vehicles currently (or recently) in use in different parts of the world.

Vintage coaches
A selection of vehicles in use in different parts of the world in the past.

See also

 Intercity bus driver
 Intercity bus service
 Carriage
 Coach (carriage)
 Coach (rail)
 Coach transport in the United Kingdom
 Charabanc
 Double-decker bus
 Family Motor Coach Association
 List of buses
 Motor bus
 Multi-axle bus
 Sleeper bus
 Side loader bus
 Transit bus

References

 Anderson, R. C. A. and Frankis, G. (1970). History of Royal Blue Express Services. David & Charles.

External links

 BBC Time Shift: The Modern Age of Coach Travel

Buses by type